The Boxing Tournament at the 1966 Asian Games was held in Indoor Stadium Huamark, Bangkok, Thailand from 10 December 1966 to 16 December 1966.

South Korea finished first in medal table by winning five gold medals, The host nation Thailand finished second behind South Korea with three gold medals.

Medalists

Medal table

References
Amateur Boxing

External links
 OCA official website

 
1966 Asian Games events
1966
Asian Games
International boxing competitions hosted by Thailand